Erroll Tucker (born July 6, 1964) is a former professional American football cornerback and return specialist. He was drafted by the Pittsburgh Steelers in the fifth round of the 1986 NFL Draft. He played college football at Utah.

Tucker has also played for the Buffalo Bills, New England Patriots and Orlando Thunder. He finished his career with the Calgary Stampeders, winning a Grey Cup with them in 1992.

See also
 List of NCAA major college yearly punt and kickoff return leaders

References

1964 births
Living people
American football cornerbacks
Utah Utes football players
Buffalo Bills players
New England Patriots players
Orlando Thunder players
Calgary Stampeders players
Players of American football from Pittsburgh
Pittsburgh Steelers players